Svenljunga is a locality and the seat of Svenljunga Municipality, Västra Götaland County, Sweden with 3,418 inhabitants in 2010.

References 

Populated places in Västra Götaland County
Populated places in Svenljunga Municipality
Municipal seats of Västra Götaland County
Swedish municipal seats